George Ellis Johnson Sr. (born June 12, 1927) is an American businessman and entrepreneur. Johnson is the founder of Johnson Products Company, an international cosmetics empire headquartered in Chicago, Illinois which created products such as Ultra Sheen and Afro Sheen.

Biography

Early life
Johnson was born in Richton, Mississippi, in a three-room sharecropper's shack. When he was two, he moved to Chicago with his mother, Priscilla, after his parents had separated. At the age of eight, while attending Doolittle Elementary School, Johnson also started work as a shoe shine boy. Johnson later attended Wendell Phillips High School but dropped out to work full-time jobs. During the day he was a bus boy and in the evenings he set pins at a local bowling alley. In 1944, Johnson took a job working for Samuel B. Fuller, who owned a cosmetics firm, as a production chemist.

Entrepreneurship
In 1954, at the encouragement of co-worker, Johnson left the Fuller company and founded Johnson Products with his wife Joan, focusing on the African American male hair care market. Johnson borrowed $250 from a bank and another $250 from a friend to finance the venture. The company's first product was Ultra Wave, a hair relaxer for men. In 1957, Ultra Sheen, a revolutionary hair straightener that could easily be used in the home, was introduced for women.

During the next quarter century, more product lines were introduced like Afro Sheen. Afro-Sheen, one of Johnson's best-known products, was released in the late 1960s, at a time when the "Afro" became a popular hairstyle for African Americans. Over the next few decades, Johnson Products continued to grow, focusing its efforts on not only its products line but on training cosmetologists on the proper usage as well. In 1964, Johnson founded Independence Bank, and during the 1970s he became the exclusive sponsor behind the nationally syndicated dance show Soul Train. In 1971, Johnson Products became the first African American-owned company to be listed on the American Stock Exchange. That same year, Johnson became the first African American to serve on the board of directors of Commonwealth Edison.

Personal
Johnson was married to Joan Betty Henderson, whom he met while they were students at Phillips High School. Johnson and Henderson in May 1950 and divorced in 1989. The couple remarried in 1995. Together they had four children; Eric, Joan, John and George E. Johnson Jr.

Awards and honors
Johnson received the Horatio Alger Award in 1981. and the Babson Medal in 1983 Johnson received an honorary Doctor of Commercial Science degree from College of the Holy Cross in 1975 and an honorary Doctor of Laws degree from Babson College in 1976.

References

1927 births
Living people
People from Richton, Mississippi
African-American businesspeople
American cosmetics businesspeople
Businesspeople from Chicago
Businesspeople from Mississippi
21st-century African-American people
20th-century African-American people